The 2019 Ukrainian Figure Skating Championships were held from 18 to 20 December 2018 in Kyiv. Medals were awarded in the disciplines of men's singles, ladies' singles, pair skating, and ice dancing. The results were among the criteria used to select Ukrainian teams to the 2019 World Championships and 2019 European Championships.

Results

Men

Ladies

Pairs

Ice dancing

References

Ukrainian Figure Skating Championships
Ukrainian Championships
Ukrainian Championships
Figure Skating Championships
Figure Skating Championships
December 2018 sports events in Ukraine
Sports competitions in Kyiv
2010s in Kyiv